This is a list of Maltese football transfers for the 2012–13 summer transfer window by club. Only transfers of clubs in the Maltese Premier League and Maltese First Division are included.

The summer transfer window opened on 1 July 2012, although a few transfers may take place prior to that date. The window closed at midnight on 31 August 2012. Players without a club may join one at any time, either during or in between transfer windows.

Maltese Premier League

Balzan

In:

Out:

Birkirkara

In:

Out:

Floriana

In:

Out:

Ħamrun Spartans

In:

Out:

Hibernians

In:

Out:

Melita

In:

Out:

Mosta

In:

Out:

Qormi

In:

Out:

Rabat Ajax

In:

Out:

Sliema Wanderers

In:

Out:

Tarxien Rainbows

In:

Out:

Valletta

In:

Out:

Maltese First Division

Birzebbuga St.Peters

In:

Out:

Dingli Swallows

In:

Out:

Gudja United

In:

Out:

Gżira United

In:

Out:

Lija Athletic

In:

Out:

Marsaxlokk

In:

Out:

Mqabba

In:

Out:

Naxxar Lions

In:

Out:

Pietà Hotspurs

In:

Out:

St. Andrews

In:

Out:

Vittoriosa Stars

In:

Out:

Zejtun Corinthians

In:

Out:

Manager Transfers

See also
  List of Bulgarian football transfers summer 2012
  List of Dutch football transfers summer 2012
  List of English football transfers summer 2012
  List of French football transfers summer 2012
  List of German football transfers summer 2012
  List of Italian football transfers summer 2012
  List of Portuguese football transfers summer 2012
  List of Spanish football transfers summer 2012
  List of Swedish football transfers summer 2012

References

External links
 Official Website

Maltese
Transfers
2012